Andrew Anderson was a mayor of Nashville, Tennessee from 1855-1857.

Life
He was born on June 19, 1795 in Nashville, Tennessee. He died on April 19, 1867 at the age of 71 from heart disease.

Politics
He was mayor of Nashville, Tennessee from 1855-1857.

References

1795 births
1867 deaths
Mayors of Nashville, Tennessee
19th-century American politicians